The Jonathan B. Postel Service Award is an award named after Jon Postel. The award has been presented most years since 1999 by the Internet Society to "honor a person who has made outstanding contributions in service to the data communications community."

The first recipient of the award was Jon Postel himself (posthumously).
The award was created by Vint Cerf as chairman of the Internet Society and announced in   "I remember IANA" published as RFC 2468.

Winners 
 2022 George Sadowsky
 2020 Onno W. Purbo
 2019 Alain Aina
 2018 Steven G. Huter
 2017 Kimberly C. Claffy
 2016 Kanchana Kanchanasut
 2015 Rob Blokzijl
 2014 Mahabir Pun
 2013 Elizabeth J. Feinler
 2012 Pierre Ouedraogo
 2011 Prof. Kilnam Chon
 2010 Dr. Jianping Wu
 2009 CSNET - Peter J. Denning, David Farber, Anthony C. Hearn, and Lawrence Landweber
 2008 La Fundacion Escuela Latinoamericana de Redes (EsLaRed)
 2007 Nii Quaynor
 2006 Bob Braden and Joyce K. Reynolds
 2005 Jun Murai
 2004 Phill Gross
 2003 Peter T. Kirstein
 2002 Stephen Wolff
 2001 Daniel Karrenberg
 2000 Scott Bradner
 1999 Jon Postel (posthumously)

See also 

 List of computer science awards

References 

Computer science awards
Awards established in 1999